Middleton-on-Lune railway station was located in Westmorland, England, (now in Cumbria), serving the hamlet and rural locale of Middleton on the Ingleton Branch Line. It was opened as Middleton in 1861 and renamed Middleton-on-Lune on 19 July 1926, closing in 1931.

History
By the time the branch was completed in 1861, the L&CR was operated by the London and North Western Railway (L&NWR).

After formal closure the line was still on occasions used for weekend excursions and to transport pupils to and from local boarding schools. Goods traffic continued until 1 October 1964. The line was maintained as a possible relief route until April 1967 when the tracks were lifted. The main station building survives as a private dwelling.

References

Notes

Sources
 Butt, R.V.J. (1995). The Directory Of Railway Stations. Patrick Stephens Limited. .
 Western, Robert (1990). The Ingleton Branch. Oxford : Oakwood Press.

External links
 The Lune Valley Railway
 Old Cumbrian Gazetteer

Disused railway stations in Cumbria
Railway stations in Great Britain opened in 1861
Railway stations in Great Britain closed in 1931
Former Lancaster and Carlisle Railway stations
1861 establishments in England